Mutholapuram  is a village in Ernakulam district Muvattupuzha Taluk in the Indian state of Kerala.Mutholapuram is a small Village/hamlet in Muvattupuzha Taluk in Ernakulam District of Kerala State, India. It comes under Elanji Panchayath. It belongs to Central Kerala Division . It is located 42 km towards East from District headquarters Kakkanad. 8 km from Pampakuda. 182 km from State capital Thiruvananthapuram.

Mutholapuram Pin code is 686665 and postal head office is Elanji .

Thirumarady ( 6 km ), Palakuzha ( 7 km ), Piravom ( 10 km ), Arakuzha ( 12 km ), Pampakuda ( 12 km ) are the nearby Villages to Mutholapuram. Mutholapuram is surrounded.                        by Uzhavoor Taluk towards South, Kaduthuruthy Taluk towards west, Muvattupuzha Taluk towards North, Lalam Taluk towards East .

Piravom, Koothattukulam, Muvattupuzha, Thodupuzha, Palai, Vaikom are the nearby cities to Mutholapuram.	

This Place is in the border of the Ernakulam District and Kottayam District. Kottayam District Monippally is South towards this place . 

Sree Mutholapuram Mudhevar Temple is one of the most ancient and prominent Trimurti temple in Kerala is located here. This is why mutholapuram was formerly known as Mudevarpuram.

The Vijnan Institute of Science and Technology (VISAT), an engineering college established in the year 2011, is 2 km away from this town. The engineering college is AICTE approved and affiliated to Mahatma Gandhi University. This college comes under the Vinjyan Charitable Trust.

St.Paul's HS, which has paved a way of life for a lot of students is also located here . Thekkemadam sree bhadrakali shetram is located in here

Institutions

Muddevar Temple
 Ayurveda Hospital
 Thekkemadam sree bhadrakali  shetram                     *Vijnan Institute Of Science And Technology (VISAT)
 Post Office
 Service CO-Operative Bank
 Veterinary Hospital
 St. Sebastians Church
 St. Pauls high School

References 

https://lsgkerala.gov.in/en/lbelection/electdmemberdet/2015/691

Villages in Ernakulam district